Alvis may refer to:

Alvis Car and Engineering Company, British luxury car and military vehicle manufacturer which later became Alvis plc
Alvis plc (formerly United Scientific Holdings plc), a defence contractor which acquired Alvis Cars and became the UK's largest armoured vehicle manufacturer
Hayes Alvis (1907–1972), American jazz bassist and tubist
Max Alvis (born 1938), Major League Baseball player
Alvis Darby (born 1954), American football player
Arvis, a major antagonist in the game Fire Emblem: Genealogy of the Holy War
Alvis E. Hamilton, a character in the anime Last Exile
Alvis, a major character in the video game Xenoblade Chronicles

See also
Alvíss, a dwarf in Norse mythology